Renata Voráčová and Barbora Záhlavová-Strýcová were the defending champions, but Voráčová decided not to participate.

Záhlavová-Strýcová played alongside Iveta Benešová but were eliminated in the Quarterfinals by Mervana Jugić-Salkić and Sandra Klemenschits.

Marina Erakovic and Elena Vesnina won in the final, beating Julia Görges and Anna-Lena Grönefeld, 7–5, 6–1.

Seeds

Draw

Draw

References
 Main Draw

Generali Ladies Linz - Doubles